Ocotea jorge-escobarii is a species of plant in the family Lauraceae.

The tree is endemic to Honduras and Nicaragua in Central America.

It is an IUCN Red List Endangered species

References

Current IUCN Red List of all Threatened Species

jorgeescobarii
Flora of Honduras
Flora of Nicaragua
Trees of Central America
Endangered flora of North America
Taxonomy articles created by Polbot